Junior Miss is a 1945 American comedy film starring Peggy Ann Garner as a teenager who meddles in people's love lives.

A collection of Sally Benson's stories from The New Yorker was published by Doubleday as Junior Miss in 1941. This was adapted by Jerome Chodorov and Joseph Fields into a successful play that same year. Directed by Moss Hart, Junior Miss ran on Broadway from 1941 to 1943. In 1945, the play was adapted to the film Junior Miss with George Seaton directing Peggy Ann Garner in the lead role of Judy Graves.  Junior Miss was adapted as a radio series three times in the late 1940s and early ‘50s, with Shirley Temple and Barbara Whiting performing the lead role.

Plot summary

Lively and imaginative sisters Judy and Lois Graves, thirteen and sixteen years old, live in an apartment in New York City with their forgiving and patient mother and father, Harry, a lawyer, and Grace, a housewife. Judy's equally energetic friend Fuffy Adams frequently visits, and the two girls have their own ideas about the relations of the grown-ups surrounding them. They often use movie plots to interpret the reality around them.

One night right before Christmas, Judy learns that her mother has a brother, uncle Willis, who has been absent for years. She is very intrigued by the news and quickly fantasizes a story about the handsome man in which jail time becomes a reason for the absence. In reality, Uncle Willis is a recovering alcoholic, who has spent the last four years struggling in rehab.

Later that night, Judy meets Fuffy, who brings a handsome boy named Haskell Cummings. The young boy's appearance distracts her from her fantasies about her uncle. Haskell is supposed to be Judy's escort to the school dance ahead. Back in the apartment, Harry's boss, J. B. Curtis, is visiting, bringing his pretty daughter, Ellen, who is also his secretary. Letting her imagination run wild after seeing a kiss, Judy believes her father is infatuated with the secretary, and tells her friend Fuffy that they are romantically involved.

The next day, Uncle Willis, handsome and rugged, makes a surprise visit, and Judy gets the idea that he would be the perfect match for Ellen. Right after Christmas Day, Judy secretly arranges for them to meet "by accident" at the Rockefeller Center ice-skating rink, and Willis and Ellen actually hit it off and become a couple. Harry's boss is troubled, though, as Ellen is constantly absent from the office, sneaking off to meet Willis. Ellen does not tell her father about Willis, but one day Judy can't keep the secret any longer, and on New Year's Day slips to Curtis that Ellen is seeing Willis, her "ex-convict" uncle. Curtis is worried and furious. He scolds Harry and Grace for letting the relationship begin and go on, and they in turn confront Judy. Willis and Ellen arrive in the middle of the argument, announcing that they have married. Curtis fires Harry when he defends Willis and his family.
 
The family decides that Grace and the children should live with her mother in Kansas City until Harry gets another job. They also offer to let the newlyweds come live with them until they can stand on their own feet. Curtis makes an unannounced visit in search of his daughter, and Ellen and Willis are hidden away for the moment. Since it is the night of Judy's school dance, Haskell arrives to pick up Judy. He is announced, and when Curtis hears the name, he believes it is Haskell Cummings Sr., the businessman whose account he and Harry have been trying to  win, who has arrived to talk to Harry. Believing that Harry is starting his own firm and has landed the influential Cummings as his client, he quickly offers to hire Harry back to the law firm, as a partner no less. And he is willing to hire Willis too. Realizing Curtis is mistaken, Harry quickly accepts the offer. Ellen reconciles with her father, and Curtis in turn  is surprised to see the young Haskell enter the apartment. Then Judy appears, beautiful and ladylike, dressed in her ball dress, and she and Haskell leave the proud adults for the dance.

Cast
Peggy Ann Garner as Judy Graves
Allyn Joslyn as Harry Graves
Stephen Dunne as Uncle Willis Reynolds (as Michael Dunne)
Faye Marlowe as Ellen Curtis
Mona Freeman as Lois Graves
Sylvia Field as Mrs. Graves
Barbara Whiting as Fuffy Adams
Stanley Prager as Joe
John Alexander as J. B. Curtis
Connie Gilchrist as Hilda

References

External links

 

1945 films
1940s Christmas comedy films
1945 comedy films
20th Century Fox films
American black-and-white films
American Christmas comedy films
American films based on plays
1940s English-language films
Films based on short fiction
Films directed by George Seaton
Films scored by David Buttolph
Films set in New York City
Films set around New Year
Films produced by William Perlberg
1940s American films